Muldrow is a surname. Notable people with the surname include: 

Georgia Anne Muldrow (born 1983), American musician
Henry L. Muldrow (1837-1905), American politician
Michelle Muldrow (born 1968), American painter
Robert Muldrow (1864-1950), American geologist
Ronald Muldrow (1949-2007), American guitarist
Sam Muldrow (born 1988), American basketball player
W. Stephen Muldrow, American lawyer